Raj Joshi Tilak (born 1 September 1936) is an Indian sprinter. He competed in the men's 100 metres at the 1960 Summer Olympics.

References

External links
 

1936 births
Living people
Athletes (track and field) at the 1960 Summer Olympics
Indian male sprinters
Olympic athletes of India
Place of birth missing (living people)